Palnik is a rural locality (a village) in Pereborskoye Rural Settlement, Beryozovsky District, Perm Krai, Russia. The population was 3 as of 2010.

Geography 
Palnik is located 33 km north of  Beryozovka (the district's administrative centre) by road. Pozdyanka is the nearest rural locality.

References 

Rural localities in Beryozovsky District, Perm Krai